APOP Paphos (in Greek: ΑΠΟΠ Πάφου), is a Cypriot professional basketball club based in Paphos, Cyprus. The club competes in the Cypriot League. The president of the team is Soteris Georgiades and the current head coach is Yiannis Livanos. The club also has a woman’s team in the Cypriot League and a wheelchair team.

History
The parent club was founded in 1953, therefore, the department of basketball founded in 2003, 3 years after the dissolution of the parent club.

Players

Current roster

Sources
Cyprus Basketball Federation
Eurobasket.com APOP Paphos BC Page

Basketball teams in Cyprus
Enosis Neon Paralimni